UFC 106: Ortiz vs. Griffin 2 was a mixed martial arts event held by the Ultimate Fighting Championship (UFC) on November 21, 2009 at the Mandalay Bay Events Center.

Background
As with UFC 103 and UFC 104, a portion of the preliminary card aired live and commercial-free during an hour-long block on Spike.
Tito Ortiz was originally scheduled to fight Mark Coleman; however, on October 5, 2009, the fight was cancelled as Coleman was suffering from a knee injury. UFC confirmed that Forrest Griffin would step in to face Ortiz.

On October 26, UFC Heavyweight Champion Brock Lesnar pulled out of his fight against Shane Carwin due to an illness that kept him from training. The UFC therefore had the Ortiz v. Griffin fight headline the UFC 106 card.

Previously announced match-ups of John Howard vs. Dennis Hallman and Kenny Florian vs. Clay Guida were moved to The Ultimate Fighter: Heavyweights Finale and UFC 107 respectively.

Tom Lawlor was originally scheduled to fight at UFC 106 but he was moved to UFC Fight Night: Maynard vs. Diaz.

Jon Fitch was originally set to fight Ricardo Almeida but Almeida was forced off the card with a knee injury. Fitch was moved to the UFC 107 card to fight Mike Pierce.

Dana White confirmed on November 19 that Karo Parisyan had pulled out of his fight against Dustin Hazelett for undisclosed reasons. Hazelett was paid his full purse including show and win. As a result, the fight between Paulo Thiago and Jacob Volkmann was promoted to the main card. Parisyan was also cut from the promotion following this incident.

Results

Bonus awards
Fighters were awarded $70,000 bonuses.

Fight of the Night: Josh Koscheck vs. Anthony Johnson
Knockout of the Night: Antônio Rogério Nogueira
Submission of the Night: Josh Koscheck

Reported payout
The following is the reported payout to the fighters as reported to the Nevada State Athletic Commission. It does not include sponsor money or "locker room" bonuses often given by the UFC and also do not include the UFC's traditional "fight night" bonuses.

Forrest Griffin: $250,000 (includes $150,000 win bonus) def. Tito Ortiz: $250,000
Josh Koscheck: $106,000 ($53,000 win bonus) def. Anthony Johnson: $17,000
Paulo Thiago: $16,000 ($8,000 win bonus) def. Jacob Volkmann: $6,000
Antônio Rogério Nogueira: $100,000 ($30,000 win bonus) def. Luiz Cane: $19,000
Amir Sadollah: $30,000 ($15,000 win bonus) def. Phil Baroni: $25,000
Ben Saunders: $20,000 ($10,000 win bonus) def. Marcus Davis: $27,000
Kendall Grove: $44,000 ($22,000 win bonus) def. Jake Rosholt: $15,000
Brian Foster: $12,000 ($6,000 win bonus) def. Brock Larson: $26,000
Caol Uno: $20,000 vs. Fabricio Camoes: $10,000 ^
George Sotiropoulos: $20,000 ($10,000 win bonus) def. Jason Dent: $8,000

^ Both fighters earned show money; bout declared majority draw.

See also
 Ultimate Fighting Championship
 List of UFC champions
 List of UFC events
 2009 in UFC

References

Ultimate Fighting Championship events
2009 in mixed martial arts
Mixed martial arts in Las Vegas
2009 in sports in Nevada